Johann George Tromlitz (November 8, 1725 – February 4, 1805), born at Reinsdorf, near Artern, Germany, was a flautist, flute maker and composer. He wrote three books on the art of flute playing.

External links
Flute History.com

German classical flautists
German composers
Flute makers
1725 births
1805 deaths